Groslée-Saint-Benoît is a commune in the Ain department of eastern France. The municipality was incorporated on January 1, 2016 and consists of the former communes of Groslée and Saint-Benoît.

Politics and administration

Municipal administration

List of mayors

See also 
Communes of the Ain department

References 

Communes of Ain
Communes nouvelles of Ain
Populated places established in 2016
2016 establishments in France